Sparrows is a 1916 Dutch silent drama film directed by Maurits Binger.

Cast
Annie Bos	... 	Mavis Keeves
Lola Cornero	... 	Victoria Davitt
Pierre Perin	... 	Harry Winderbank jr.
Paula de Waart	... 	Buurvrouw van Mavis
Fred Penley		
Max Leeds	... 	Charlie Percival
Willem van der Veer		
Alex Benno

External links 
 

1916 films
Dutch silent feature films
Dutch black-and-white films
1916 drama films
Films directed by Maurits Binger
Dutch drama films
Silent drama films